"Take Me to Your Heart" is a 1996 ballad recorded by English pop duo Bananarama. It appears on their seventh album, Ultra Violet and was released as its second and final single. It would also be Bananarama's last single release for five years. The song was remixed prior to its release as a single. Trance, techno, disco, and reggae versions were released, with the disco remix containing samples from Anita Ward's number-one single from 1979, "Ring My Bell".

Critical reception
Larry Flick from Billboard described the song as a "springy number", noting that it is "covered in vibrant synths and a cute chorus that you'll be singing along with in moments."

Music video
A music video was produced to promote the single. It appears to be one of their lowest budget productions and resembles a home movie, featuring Sara Dallin and Keren Woodward walking outdoors through fields of tall grass.

Remixes
"Take Me To Your Heart" (Album Version) - (3:55)
Taken from the CD albums "Ultra Violet" & "I Found Love"
"Take Me To Your Heart" (Radio Heart Edit) - (3:20)
"Take Me To Your Heart" (Electronic Heart Mix) - (6:02)
"Take Me To Your Heart" (Tony De Vit Trance Mix) - (7:51)
Remixed by Tony De Vit
"Take Me To Your Heart" (Sweetbox Disco Mix) - (3:04)
"Take Me To Your Heart" (Mark Cyrus Reggae Mix) - (5:27)
Remixed by Mark Cyrus
"Take Me To Your Heart" (Tony De Vit Radio Mix) - (4:46)
Remixed by Tony De Vit

Charts

References

1996 singles
Bananarama songs
Songs written by Sara Dallin
Songs written by Keren Woodward
Festival Records singles
1995 songs
ZYX Music singles
Songs written by Scott Storch
Songs written by Paul Barry (songwriter)